John Wesley McAdams (April 15, 1912 – October 18, 1975) was an American professional basketball player. He played for the Akron Goodyear Wingfoots in the National Basketball League (NBL) from 1937 to 1940. For his career he averaged 2.1 points per game and helped lead the Wingfoots to the NBL championship in 1937–38. 

In college, McAdams attended Ohio Wesleyan University, where he played both basketball and baseball.

References

1912 births
1975 deaths
Akron Goodyear Wingfoots players
American men's basketball players
Basketball players from Ohio
Guards (basketball)
Ohio Wesleyan Battling Bishops baseball players
Ohio Wesleyan Battling Bishops men's basketball players
People from Urbana, Ohio